The Atlantic Mutual Insurance Company was a mutual insurance company which offers personal, marine, commercial property, and casualty insurance. It is part of the Atlantic Mutual Companies, which includes Centennial Insurance Company. Its corporate headquarters are at 140 Broadway, a block from the World Trade Center.

History
The company was founded in 1838 as the Atlantic Insurance Company. Originally a joint-stock company, it became a mutual company on April 11, 1842. Its first chairman was Walter Restored Jones, a member of a prominent upper-class family of attorneys in New York City. The Jones family ran the company for decades.

By the 1850s, Atlantic Mutual was the largest marine and general insurance firm in North America and the only marine insurance firm in New York state. During the 1850s, it made exceedingly high profits. In 1852, the company began keeping a clipping service of newspaper accounts of shipwrecks and sinkings known as Vessel Disasters, a work which became famous as the best source of information on maritime disasters in the North Atlantic. During the Civil War, Atlantic Mutual was the primary insurer of most Union shipping.

In 1874, Atlantic Mutual President John Divine Jones provided the money which established the permanent foundation of the New York Historical Society. William H. H. Moore served as president from 1895 to 1897, when he was succeeded by Anton A. Raven. In 1915, after sixty-three years with the company, Anton A. Raven retired as president and was succeeded by Cornelius Eldert, formerly vice president. Eldert served as president until his death in 1930. Following Eldert's death in 1930, Walter Wood Parsons was elected to the presidency in February 1930. In 1934, William D. Winter was elected president to succeed Parsons.

In 1946, J. Arthur Bogardus was elected president with Winter, becoming chairman of the board. Upon Franklin B. Tuttle's elevation to the presidency in February 1951, Bogardus became chairman. Upon Bogardus' retirement in 1953, Tuttle was elevated to board chairman and Miles F. York became the new president of the Atlantic Mutual and Centennial Insurance Companies. York retired as chairman of the board in 1969. Atlantic Mutual built the existing building at 45 Wall Street in 1959, which served as the company's headquarters until the mid-1970s. Vacant and deteriorating for more than 20 years, it was sold in 1996 and converted to apartments.

Atlantic Mutual was involved in a significant tax law case which reached the U.S. Supreme Court in the 1990s. The Tax Reform Act of 1986 altered the formula under which insurance companies could deduct additions to their financial reserves. The Internal Revenue Service (IRS) determined that Atlantic Mutual had strengthened its reserves, but the company countered that it had merely engaged in a computational change.  In a unanimous decision, the Supreme Court upheld the IRS' interpretation of the law.

After the construction of the World Trade Center, Atlantic Mutual moved its headquarters from 45 Wall Street to 140 Broadway.  The company was one of many which insured buildings in and around the World Trade Center, and the firm suffered significant losses after the September 11 attacks. Since Atlantic Mutual was more than 100 years old, the company was a member of The Hundred Year Association of New York.

Decline and liquidation
In 1995, Atlantic Mutual sold its data center facility in Roanoke, Virginia to MFX Roanoke, Inc. In 2003, the company sold the renewal rights to its commercial overland Marine and Ocean Going Cargo business to Travelers, and its Specialty Lines business to OneBeacon Insurance. In 2004, the company "scaled down its operations to focus solely on personal lines business, particularly in the high net worth market." After a downgrade by A.M. Best in 2006, the company also sold its "high net worth personal lines business to Ace Group" in 2007.

In 2010, New York state insurance regulators revoked Atlantic Mutual's insurance licenses and placed it into rehabilitation because it had a negative capital and surplus of $25.1 million. On April 27, 2011, the Supreme Court of the State of New York, County of New York, declared that Atlantic Mutual and Centennial Insurance Company were insolvent, and placed them in liquidation after the company was swamped with workers' compensation insurance claims. James J. Wrynn, the Superintendent of Insurance of the State of New York was appointed liquidator.

Famous shipwrecks insured by Atlantic Mutual
As the largest marine insurance firm in the United States for many years, Atlantic Mutual became involved in some of the most famous shipwrecks in American history.

SS Central America - The company insured the SS Central America, a sidewheel steamship laden with gold which sank in a hurricane in September 1857. When the wreck was rediscovered by the Columbus-American Discovery Group, Inc. on September 11, 1987, Atlantic Mutual and 38 other insurance companies filed suit against the treasure-hunting firm, claiming that because they paid damages for the lost gold they had the right to it. In a precedent-setting court case on telepossession, the 4th Circuit Court of Appeals ruled against Atlantic Mutual and the other insurance companies and awarded 92 percent of the gold to the Columbus-American Group.
Mary Celeste - Atlantic Mutual was also one of the insurers of the Mary Celeste, an American brigantine sailing out of Staten Island, New York. In December 1872, a month after leaving Staten Island for Italy, the ship was seen adrift and without her crew and no explanation for the "ghost ship" has ever successfully explained why the ship was abandoned. Atlantic Mutual established a small museum dedicated to the mystery of the Mary Celeste at its corporate headquarters, which included a model of the ship and the captain's lap desk.
RMS Titanic - The Atlantic Mutual Insurance Company also helped to insure the RMS Titanic.  The ship was insured for $140,000, of which $100,000 was held by Atlantic Mutual. The largest passenger steamship in the world at the time, the Titanic struck an iceberg on the night of April 14, 1912, during her maiden voyage and sank with more than 1,500 people still aboard two hours and forty minutes later.

Notable presidents, chairman and directors of the Atlantic Mutual
The Atlantic Mutual Insurance Co. has been led by a number of prominent New Yorkers as well as leading American business people.  Among them are:

Presidents
 1895–1897: William H. H. Moore
 1897–1915: Anton A. Raven
 1915–1930: Cornelius Eldert
 1930–1934: Walter Wood Parsons
 1934–1946: William D. Winter 
 1946–1951: J. Arthur Bogardus
 1951–1953: Franklin B. Tuttle 
 1953–1966: Miles F. York
 1966–1969: David A. Floreen
 1970–1976: Harold A. Eckmann
 1976–1985: John J. Mackowski
 1985–1988: Edward K. Trowbridge
 1988–1995: Kenneth J. Gorman
 1995–1997: Klaus G. Dorfi
 1997–2004: Kermit C. Smith
 2004–2008: Daniel H. Olmsted

Directors
E. Virgil Conway
Cleveland E. Dodge Jr.
William E. Dodge Jr.
Eugene R. McGrath

See also
List of oldest companies
Early skyscrapers

Notes

References
Atlantic Mutual Companies. Meeting the Challenges of Our Time: 2001 Annual Report. New York: Atlantic Mutual Companies, 2001.
Bagli, Charles V. "45 Wall St. Is Renting Again Where Tower Deal Failed." New York Times. February 8, 2003.
Clayton, W. Woodford and Nelson, William. History of Bergen and Passaic Counties, New Jersey: With Biographical Sketches of Many of Its Pioneers and Prominent Men. Philadelphia: Everts & Peck, 1882.
Eaton, John P. and Haas, Charles A. Titanic: A Journey Through Time. New York:  W. W. Norton & Company, 1999. 
Fay, Charles Edey. The Story of the "Mary Celeste". Mineola, N.Y.: Dover Publications, 1988. 
Godwin, John, This Baffling World. New York: Hart Publishing, 1968.
Hunt, Freeman. Lives of American Merchants. Vol. 1.  New York: H.W. Derby, 1857.
Jaher, Frederic Cople. The Urban Establishment: Upper Strata in Boston, New York, Charleston, Chicago, and Los Angeles. Urbana, Ill.: University of Illinois Press, 1982. 
Jones, Thomas and DeLancey, Edward Floyd. History of New York During the Revolutionary War: And of the Leading Events in the Other Colonies at that Period. New York: New York Historical Society, 1879.
Kinder, Gary. Ship of Gold in the Deep Blue Sea. New York: Vintage Books, 1998.  
Rousmaniere, John. After the Storm: True Stories of Disaster and Recovery at Sea. New York:  McGraw-Hill Professional, 2002. 
"Steam on the Atlantic." New York Times. December 10, 1882.
Weil, François. A History of New York. New York: Columbia University Press, 2004.

Further reading
Cosgrove, John. Gray Days and Gold: A Character Sketch of the Atlantic Mutual Insurance Co. New York:  Atlantic Mutual Companies, 1967.

Financial services companies established in 1838
Insurance companies of the United States
Companies based in New York City
Mutual insurance companies
1838 establishments in New York (state)
American companies established in 1838
Insurance companies based in New York City